Turkovice is a municipality and village in Pardubice District in the Pardubice Region of the Czech Republic. It has about 300 inhabitants.

Administrative parts
The villages of Bumbalka and Rašovy are administrative parts of Turkovice.

References

External links

Villages in Pardubice District